Xingzipu Town is an urban town in Shuangfeng County, Hunan Province, People's Republic of China.

Administrative division
The town is divided into 74 villages and 1 community, the following areas: 
 
  Mujiatang Community
  Gaojia Village
  Qingle Village
  Shihu Village
  Wangmao Village
  Xiheng Village
  Huashu Village
  Songgui Village
  Heyi Village
  Douyan Village
  Yanhe Village
  Meizi Village
  Nixi Village
  Shuangchong Village
  Wuhe Village
  Xitang Village
  Ziyuan Village
  Xikou Village
  Shuangyuan Village
  Guangjing Village
  Chuangshi Village
  Hexin Village
  Xingzi Village
  Tingzi Village
  Mujia Village
  Pinduan Village
  Huajia Village
  Dashu Village
  Jiangkou Village
  Guihua Village
  Tongxin Village
  Ouyuan Village
  Qingyuan Village
  Shibi Village
  Xin'an Village
  Hetang Village
  Shiba Village
  Yunting Village
  Daping Village
  Quanba Village
  Xinhui Village
  Leye Village
  Changhe Village
  Longfan Village
  Gaoni Village
  Juzhen Village
  Tongsheng Village
  Hutang Village
  Shuangshi Village
  Shuini Village
  Ceshui Village
  Longtang Village
  Dakang Village
  Baisha Village
  Xiaoyao Village
  Hupo Village
  Wannian Village
  Bijia Village
  Hemu Village
  Hefeng Village
  Xianfeng Village
  Hongyang Village
  Hejia Village
  Xuetang Village
  Dafeng Village
  Pingshang Village
  Xuanfeng Village
  Gaoguang Village
  Mayi Village
  Zhangmu Village
  Aotou Village
  Hongsheng Village
  Yanqiao Village
  Minzhu Village
  Li'ai Village 

Divisions of Shuangfeng County